Karen Peetz was the president of The Bank of New York Mellon from 2013 to 2016. She had joined the company and 1998, and prior to her appointment as the bank's first female president, had led the bank's financial markets and treasury services team; she was consistently ranked among the most powerful women in banking and was ranked as No.1 in 2011.

In 2009, she co-founded the Bank of New York Mellon Women's Initiative Network (WIN), a resource group for female employees' professional development.

In 2020, she joined Citi as Chief Administrative Officer.

Peetz earned her Bachelor of Science degree from the Pennsylvania State University, and a Master of Science in Applied Behavioral Science degree from Johns Hopkins University Carey Business School.

References

Living people
Pennsylvania State University alumni
Johns Hopkins Carey Business School alumni
American bank presidents
Year of birth missing (living people)
20th-century American businesspeople
American women chief executives
20th-century American businesswomen
21st-century American women